Ancistrus claro is a species of armored catfish endemic to Brazil where it is found in the Cuiabá River basin. This species grows to a length of  SL.

References
 

claro
Fish of South America
Fish of Brazil
Endemic fauna of Brazil
Fish described in 1999